Laury Haytayan is a Lebanese oil and gas expert in the Middle East and North Africa. Since 2011, she has been leading the parliamentary capacity development portfolio at the Natural Resource Governance Institute (NRGI) in the MENA region, focusing on the legislative and oversight roles of Arab parliamentarians in advancing reforms in the Middle East Oil and Gas sector.

Personal life

Laury was born to Armenian parents Garabed and Mayram Haytayan on October 13, 1975, exactly six months after the start of the Lebanese Civil War. She was born and raised in Antelias, a town on the coast of the Metn District in the Mount Lebanon Governorate.

Laury pursued her bachelor's degree of Arts in Communication Design from the Lebanese American University in Ras Beirut, an area earlier restricted to Christians. She later earned a master's degree in 'Middle East Politics' from the University of Exeter in Devon, United Kingdom. Laury later shifted her focus to the Oil and Gas Sector in Lebanon, as a means for national development and peace building.

Career life

Laury Haytayan is the MENA Senior Officer at the Natural Resource Governance Institute (NRGI) formerly the Revenue Watch Institute, a framework of the Natural Resource Charter. She leads both regional parliamentary and media programs and was involved in the development of a MENA extractive industries knowledge hub. Prior to joining NRGI, Haytayan was the executive director of Arab Region Parliamentarians Against Corruption (ARPAC), a chapter within the Global Organization of Parliamentarians Against Corruption. She worked with parliamentarians from Arab parliament, developing strategies and action plans to strengthen the oversight and legislative capacities of parliamentarians to promote accountability and transparency.

Previously, she was in charge of regional grass root projects focused on promoting the role of women in development and policy making in several GCC countries, specifically in Bahrain, Yemen and Saudi Arabia. She also worked as grant manager, advocacy specialist and trainer for several international NGOs, including International Research and Exchanges Board (IREX), Agricultural Cooperative Development International/Volunteers in Overseas Cooperative Assistance (ACDI/VOCA), and Economic and Social Commission for Western Asia (ESCWA), focusing mainly on civil society democracy campaigns in Lebanon and Iraq.

She was invited by the Carter Center for the Election monitoring of the Tunisian parliamentary elections in 2011, the first elections following the Tunisian Revolution and the ousting of Zine El Abidine Ben Ali.

Since 2004, Haytayan started working with different stakeholders such as youth, women, devastated communities and parliamentarians to build "pro-active" societies, and to promote a culture of accountability and transparency, and rule of law in public spheres and institutions.

Laury received the Gold Distinction and Excellence Award by the Arab Women Council in 2014 for her role in promoting social responsibility.

Haytayan was honored on International Women's Day in 2015 by the Green Party of Lebanon for her work in supporting the participation of women in politics.

Publications

 "Beirut", Cities of the Middle East and North Africa: A Historical Encyclopedia, edited by Michael Dumper & Bruce Stanley, December 2006 (English)
 "Ohanes Pacha", Nairi Armenian Periodical, December 2008 (Arabic)
 "What Unites Us", Nairi Armenian Periodical, December 2009 (Arabic)
 "Armenian Christians in Jerusalem: 1700 years of Peaceful Presence", Politics and Religion Journal, Volume V (No.2), autumn 2011 (English)

Articles

Haytayan was featured in the Moscow-based news agency Interfax discussing Lebanon's energy sector. She was quoted saying "Currently, I am not optimistic at all. A system that is incapable to deal with its rubbish is unable to manage a hydrocarbon sector. According to the 3D seismic survey offshore Lebanon, there is great potential. However, the risks in Lebanon are very high, which puts [the country] in a weak position vis-a-vis the companies. The government needs to show real interest in institutional reforms before anything else."

Laury Haytayan, expert in natural resource governance in MENA talks the Voice of America about the challenges and opportunities of oil and gas discoveries in Lebanon, she says: "This goes beyond oil and gas, the sector could be used to rebuild trust in the government"  

Laury Haytayan, cited as one of the leaders of the civil society talks about the importance of Beneficial Ownership in the oil and gas sector and especially in Lebanon. She is quoted saying: In many cases throughout the global oil and gas industry those companies bidding for — and sometimes winning — petroleum contracts have close ties to the government through connections that influence the award. These companies can mask the identity of their ownership: "They’re hiding behind companies and law firms, behind shell companies or even entities that do not exist"  

Laury Haytayan was interviewed by L’Orient Le Jour after receiving the Golden Award from the Arab Women Council in Dubai, for her achievement in “Social Accountability. In this interview she stresses on the need to have women role models in the region to encourage young ladies and women to pursue a career in difficult domains such as politics and publi affairs”  

In this article, Laury Haytayan explains that civil society can already begin preparing for potential EITI implementation in Lebanon. "Civil society has to get together and they have to elect representatives" who will eventually be part of the MSG, she says. "If you don’t have representatives from civil society, you cannot start with the EITI because you don’t have the major body [the MSG] running the whole initiative." 

Laury Haytayan writes an article about the Extractive Industries Transparency Initiative (EITI) and how it could benefit a country such as Lebanon  

A Q & A with Laury Haytayan on oil and gas in Lebanon, she says: The more Civil Society is informed, better it will be able to advocate for a more transparent and accountable process, building the capacity and technical expertise is crucial especially the sector is not developed yet. NGOs will need to advocate for open bidding, for publishing contracts, for the need to make the fiscal terms known. 

Laury Haytayan interviewed by iloubnan on the eve of the first parliamentary extension in May 2013, she says: It's a bullet in democracy for Lebanon.

Television Interviews

 Laury Haytayan's interview on LBCI’s "naharkonsaid" to discuss the parliamentary elections of May 2013 and her program as candidate (2013) 
 Laury Haytayan's interview on Al Jadeed with Georges Salibi in "Esbou3 fi Saa'a" to discuss her program as a candidate for parliamentary elections and her views on Lebanon's current affairs. (19 October 2014)
 Laury Haytayan's interview with Shada Omar on "Kalima Horra" on Télé Liban to discuss the second extension of the Lebanese parliament in November 2014. She was the guest of the program along with MPs Walid Khoury and Joseph Maalouf  (November 2014) 
 Laury Haytayan's interview on Al Jazeera English to discuss the oil and gas sector in Lebanon. Haytayan said, "We are happy it has stopped for now. Initially, everything was moving at a very fast pace. The vast majority of people didn't know anything about the sector, and so could not hold the government accountable; plus, we need to know how to manage people's expectations."
Haytayan made an appearance in August 2015 on the pan-Arab news website "Arab Economic News", where she discussed the gas sector in both Cyprus and Israel, and how Lebanon could learn from their experience.

See also
 Zaven Kouyoumdjian
 Natural Resource Charter
 ESCWA
 Armenians in Lebanon

References

People from Beirut
Lebanese journalists
Lebanese American University alumni
Alumni of the University of Exeter
Sustainability advocates
Development specialists
Lebanese people of Armenian descent
1975 births
Living people